Lasioglossum cupromicans  is a Palearctic species of sweat bee.

References

External links
Images representing  Lasioglossum cupromicans

Hymenoptera of Europe
cupromicans
Insects described in 1903